Benji Okubo (October 27, 1904April 15, 1975) was an American-Japanese painter, teacher, and landscape designer. He and his family were held in internment camps during World War II.

He was the eldest of the seven children of Tometsugu "Frank" Okubo and  Miejoko Kato. Artist Miné Okubo was his sister.

He studied at the Otis Art Institute in Los Angeles, 1927-1929, where he was awarded prizes. He studied under Stanton Macdonald-Wright at the Art Students League of Los Angeles, and later collaborated with him. Okubo's work was part of group exhibitions at the San Francisco Art Museum and the Los Angeles County Museum of Art.

Okubo served as director of the Art Students League from 1940 to mid-1942, when he was interned at the Pomona Assembly Center outside Los Angeles. Later in the year, he was transferred to the Heart Mountain Relocation Center in Wyoming. He and fellow artist Hideo Date initiated evening and Saturday art classes at the internment camp. Date soon withdrew from teaching, but Okubo taught until his release in September 1945. Estelle Peck Ishigo was one of his students. Chisato Takashima was another student, and they married in Billings, Montana on June 12, 1945. 

Okubo returned to his landscape design business after his internment. He and his wife had a daughter,  Mi-Ya Okubo.

Following his death, widow Chisato Takashima Okubo donated his paintings to the Japanese American National Museum in Los Angeles.

Selected works
 Vision of the Blue Lily (Self-Portrait) (1930s), private collection
 Untitled (Green-Faced Woman (1930s), Japanese American National Museum, Los Angeles
 Woman with Cat (1942-1945), Japanese American National Museum, Los Angeles
 Untitled (Dungeon: Well of Sorrow) (1942-1945), Japanese American National Museum, Los Angeles
 Untitled (Impaled Soldier) (1942-1945), Japanese American National Museum, Los Angeles
 Untitled (Hand of God) (1942-1945), Japanese American National Museum, Los Angeles
 Atom Bomb (1945), Japanese American National Museum, Los Angeles

References

External links

 

1904 births
1975 deaths
Japanese-American internees
American landscape architects
American artists of Japanese descent
Artists from Riverside, California
Artists from Los Angeles